This List of Munitions of the Egyptian Air Force lists the missiles, bombs and related equipment in use by the Egyptian Air Force.

List

References

Egyptian Air Force
Military equipment of Egypt